This is a list of World War I flying aces from Argentina:

 Captain Alexander Beck, 11 victories scored in Royal Aircraft Factory SE.5s, served in the Royal Flying Corps and its successor, the Royal Air Force.
 Captain Thomas Colvill-Jones, 11 victories scored in Bristol F.2 Fighters, served in the Royal Flying Corps.
 Sottotenente Eduardo Alfredo Olivero, 9 victories while flying for 91a Squadriglia of Corpo Aeronautico Militare.
 Lieutenant Bertram Hutchinson Smyth, 8 victories while flying as a gunner in Bristol F.2 Fighters, served in the RAF.
 Lieutenant Thomas Traill, 8 victories scored piloting Bristol F.2 Fighters in the RAF.

See also
No. 164 Squadron RAF

References

Argentina
Flying aces
Argentine aviators
Argentina in World War I